The Swallow Doretti is a two-seater British sports car built on Swallow's own design of box-section tube chassis using Triumph TR2 mechanicals, made between 1954 and 1955. It was intended for the U.S. market and to be a more refined two-seater than available there at that time.

Swallow
The car was built by the Swallow Coachbuilding Company Ltd., a Tube Investments Group subsidiary bought for its 1935-1946 association with Jaguar's prewar motorcycle sidecars.

Name
The Doretti name was derived from Dorothy Deen, who managed the Western US distributorship Cal Sales.
The Trade Mark logo and Doretti name are in the ownership of Canadian Peter Schömer. He is building a new limited edition sports car called the Doretti TR250 'Corsa Veloce' using the Ferrari TR 250 chassis and engine from 1957.

Design
Some observers find similarities between the Doretti and the 166MM 'Barchetta' and Austin-Healey 100. Based on the Triumph TR2, the  Straight-4 Doretti had much improved stability, its track was  wider, and its wheelbase  longer.
The Doretti had a tubular Reynolds 531  manganese–molybdenum, medium-carbon steel chassis. Reynolds was another member of the T I Group. The double-skinned body had an inner structural skin made of steel and an aluminium outer skin. Most cars were supplied with Laycock-de Normanville electric epicyclic overdrive and they were capable of 100 mph. 276 Mk I cars were made, including a single fixed head coupe version. The car was designed by in-house engineer Frank Rainbow, and produced in the TI factory at The Airport, Walsall, Staffordshire, England.

Three prototype Mk II cars, the Sabre were produced. These had a stiffer chassis and better weight distribution.

The Doretti was the only car that the TI Group ever built under the Swallow name.  Production stopped in 1955 when the parent company TI Group changed policy. Allegedly, pressure placed on TI directors by the British motor industry, most notably Jaguar, alleged that Doretti production created a conflict of interest for TI by giving Swallow an advantage over other customers in buying its products.

Performance
The test car cost £1,158 including taxes.

The standard version without overdrive cost £1,102.  At the time a Triumph TR2 cost £887.

In popular culture
A Doretti appeared in the 1959 film On the Beach.

See also
 List of car manufacturers of the United Kingdom

References

External links

 Swallow Doretti pages
 Swallow Doretti info

Sports cars
Cars introduced in 1954
Convertibles
Rear-wheel-drive vehicles